Cüvə (also, Cuvə, Güvə, and Dzhuva) is a village and municipality in the Agdash Rayon of Azerbaijan.  It has a population of 496.

References 

 (as Cuvə)

Populated places in Agdash District